Tverrbottindene is a mountain ridge with a number of high peaks in Lom Municipality in Innlandet county, Norway. The mountain is surrounded by several other notable mountains including Tverrbytthornet to the southeast, Kyrkja to the south, Stehøi and Stetinden to the southwest, Smørstabbtindene to the west, and Store Bukkeholstinden.

The main peaks of the mountain ridge include:

See also
List of mountains of Norway by height

References

Jotunheimen
Lom, Norway
Mountains of Innlandet